The Peter Wentz House is a historic building located in northern downtown Provo, Utah, United States. It is listed on the National Register of Historic Places.

Description
Built sometime between 1866 and 1870, the Wentz home is reminiscent of the Federal row-house design predominantly found in the Eastern United States. The Peter Wentz House was designated to the Provo City Historic Landmarks Registry on April 26, 1996. Although located across the street (North University Avenue) from the historic Brigham Young Academy (now Provo City Library), it is immediately surrounded on all sides by modern condominiums.

Structure
The Peter Wentz House is a two-story salt-box residence built on a foundation of cobblestone. The exterior cornice of the home boasts crown molding trim, however the rest of the outward appearance of the home is quite plain. Two fireplaces still exist in the home, and the home also contains a stone cellar. The Wentz home is one room wide and two stories tall.  The front facade of the home is symmetrical. All bays have wooden sills and lintels. The house remains functional and structurally sound.

Peter Mastin Wentz
Born on July 3, of 1831 in Wayne County, Pennsylvania, Peter Wentz was born into Methodist lifestyle. He was one of eight children to his mother, Mercy Green. His father, also named Peter, was a Methodist minister. His family eventually encountered turmoil, due to the death of Peter's mother and the failure of finances within the family. Still in his youth, Peter had to leave home and education behind, apprenticing as a boot and shoemaker.

In his twentieth year, Peter Wentz embraced the beliefs of the Church of Jesus Christ of Latter-day Saints (LDS Church), converting into the religion. Desiring to be a part of the main mass of members of the church at that time, Wentz travelled to Nauvoo, Illinois then to St. Louis, Missouri, and eventually walked the long trail to Salt Lake City, Utah. Years later, in 1871, Peter served as a missionary for the church in New York.

In the year 1857, Peter Wentz settled down in the city of Provo, where he employed himself in the boot and shoe business. For the next several year, Wentz carried goods, traded goods, and prospected in the state of Montana. Wentz married a woman by the name of Minerva Boren in 1864, and with her parented nine kids.

Wentz continued on to be a great asset to the Provo community. Serving on the Provo City Council for ten years, serving as a Justice of the Peace, and serving as director and secretary of the Provo Bench Corral and Irrigation Company for sixteen years. He also continued to serve in the LDS Church, as the first bishop in the Timpanogas Ward, a position in which he served for eighteen years.

The house was listed on the National Register of Historic Places in 1978.

See also

 National Register of Historic Places listings in Utah County, Utah

References

  2002. "Historic Provo" Provo City Landmarks Commission.
 Roberts, Allen D.  National Park Service. "National Register of Historic Places Inventory -- Nomination Form." August 1977.

External links

 NRHP Listings in Provo Utah

Houses in Provo, Utah
Houses completed in the 19th century
Houses on the National Register of Historic Places in Utah
National Register of Historic Places in Provo, Utah